Formed in 2004, Building Markets, formerly "'Peace Dividend Trust'" (PDT) is a non-profit organization that builds markets, creates jobs and sustains peace in developing countries by championing local entrepreneurs and connecting them to new business opportunities. Building Markets has carried out project work in over a dozen countries including Kosovo, Sierra Leone, Afghanistan, Haiti, Liberia, Timor-Leste, Democratic Republic of Congo, Solomon Islands and Ivory Coast.

Notes and references

Development charities based in the United States
Charities based in New York (state)